Ona Kreivytė-Naruševičienė (born October 31, 1935 Jovaiša, Deltuva) is a Lithuanian ceramic artist.

Biography 
Her sister is Zita Kreivytė. In 1961, she graduated from the Lithuanian Institute of Fine Arts. In 1960-1974, she worked at the House of Folk Art, 1974–1994, the Vilnius Art "WORKS, 1994-1995, company "Vilnius Art" artist.

Works 
Creator plot ceramic sculptures in the form of small village of fishermen living subject ("Fishermen", 1973, "the potter's family," 1977), monumental works of decorative plastic exterior ("crucified" I-III, 1972), parks, abstract expressive silhouette Song ("Fire of Life" 1976, "Autumn" 1978, "Memories of Italy" in 1979, "Life Rafts" in 1988), spatial compositions ("Childhood Clouds" in 1985), vases, plates.

She created panels of decorative ceramics in public and private interiors of Vilnius (Old Town, New Town, Vilnius Airport, in 1997, with her husband and son, J. and R. Naruševičius) and other cities.

Her works stylized, in aggregate form, restrained earth colors, they highlight the šamotinio clay material and texture. Since 1961 has participated in exhibitions in Lithuania and abroad (Faenza, Valauris, Sopot), they earned diplomas.

Her individual exhibitions were held in Vilnius in 1974, 1985, 1997, 2006, Kaunas, 2000 Works to Lithuanian Art Museum, the Lithuanian National Museum, National Museum of Fine Arts Čiurlionis.

See also 
 List of Lithuanian painters

References

External links 
 "Ona Kreivytė-Naruševičienė", Lithuanian Wikipedia

Lithuanian painters
1935 births
Living people
Vilnius Academy of Arts alumni